The Philippine languages or Philippinic are a proposed group by R. David Paul Zorc (1986) and Robert Blust (1991; 2005; 2019) that include all the languages of the Philippines and northern Sulawesi, Indonesia—except Sama–Bajaw (languages of the "Sea Gypsies") and a few languages of Palawan—and form a subfamily of Austronesian languages. Although the Philippines is near the center of Austronesian expansion from Formosa, there is little linguistic diversity among the approximately 150 Philippine languages, suggesting that earlier diversity has been erased by the spread of the ancestor of the modern Philippine languages.

Classification

History and criticism

One of the first explicit classifications of a "Philippine" grouping based on genetic affiliation was in 1906 by Frank Blake, who placed them as a subdivision of the "Malay branch" within Malayo-Polynesian (MP), which at that time was considered as a family. Blake however encompasses every language within the geographic boundaries of the Philippine archipelago to be under a single group. Formal arguments in support of a specific "Proto-Philippines" were followed by Matthew Charles in 1974, Teodoro Llamzon in 1966 and 1975, and Llamzon and Teresita Martin in 1976. Blust (1991) two decades later updates this based on Zorc's (1986) inclusion of Yami, and the Sangiric, Minahasan, and Gorontalo groups.

The genetic unity of a Philippines group has been rejected particularly by Lawrence Reid. This arose with problems in reconstructing Philippine subgroups within MP (Pawley, 1999; Ross, 2005). In a recent state-of-the art on the classification of Philippine languages, he provides multidisciplinary arguments on the field's methodological and theoretical shortcomings since Conant's description in the early 1900s. This includes Malayo-Polynesian archeology (Spriggs, 2003; 2007; 2011), and Bayesian phylogenetic analyses (Gray et al., 2009) substantiating the multiplicity of historical diffusion and divergence of languages across the archipelago. He suggests that the primary branches under this widely acknowledged Philippine group should instead be promoted as primary branches under Malayo-Polynesian. Malcolm Ross (2005) earlier also noted that the Batanic languages, constituting Yami, Itbayat, and Ivatan, should in fact be considered as a primary MP branch. In an evaluation of the lexical innovations among the Philippine languages, Alexander Smith (2017) regards the evidence for a Philippine subgroup as weak, and concludes that "they may represent more than one primary subgroup or perhaps an innovation-defined linkage". Chen et al. (2022) present further arguments for the Philippine languages being a convergence area rather than a unified phylogenetic subgroup.

Internal classification
The Philippine group is proposed to have originated from Proto-Malayo-Polynesian and ultimately from Proto-Austronesian. There have been several proposals as to the composition within the group, but the most widely accepted groupings today is the consensus classifications by Blust (1991; 2005) and Reid (2017); however, both disagree on the existence of a Philippine group as a single genetic unit.

Zorc (1979)
An earlier classification by Zorc (1979) is presented below. From approximately north to south, a Philippine group according to his analysis of previous reconstructions are divided into two main subgroups, Northern or "Cordilleran" and Southern or "Sulic". Note that the groupings herein no longer reflect widely accepted classifications or naming conventions today. For example South Extension nowadays reflects the widely established Central Luzon, and North Mangyan within Cordilleran is not supported by later reconstructions; the group containing Yami, Ivatan and Itbayat is called "Bashiic" in Zorc (1977) and remains generally accepted.

Northern Philippines or Cordilleran
Pangasinic (includes Ilongot, Kallahan, Ibaloi, Pangasinan)
Central Cordilleran (includes Isinai, Kalinga, Bontoc, Balangao, Ifugao)
Ilokan (within Ilokano alone)
Northern Cordilleran or Banagic (includes Ibanag, Isneg, Gaddang)
Yami–Ivatan–Itbayat
South Extension (includes Sambal group, Kapampangan)
North Mangyan
Southern Philippines or Sulic
Meso-Philippine
South Mangyan (includes Hanunuo)
Palawan
Subanon (dialect cluster)
Central Philippine (includes Tagalog, Bikol, Visayan, Mansakan)
Manobo (includes Kagayanen, Western Bukidnon, Cotabato Manobo)
Danao (includes Maranao, Maguindanao)
Celebes Extension (includes Mongondow group)

Blust (1991; 2005)
From approximately north to south, the Philippine languages are divided into 12 subgroups (including unclassified languages):

Batanic languages (4 languages between Batanes and Lanyu Island, Taiwan)
Northern Luzon languages (40 languages, including Ilokano and Pangasinan)
Central Luzon languages (5 languages, including Sambal and Kapampangan)
Northern Mindoro languages (or North Mangyan; 3 languages)
Greater Central Philippine languages
Southern Mindoro languages (or South Mangyan; 3 languages)
Central Philippine languages (40 languages, including Tagalog, Bikol languages and Visayan languages)
Palawan languages (3 languages)
Subanen languages (6 languages; sometimes considered one dialect cluster)
Danao languages (3 languages; Iranun language, Maguindanao and Maranao)
Manobo languages (15 languages)
Gorontalo–Mongondow languages (9 languages of Gorontalo and North Sulawesi)
Ati language
Manide–Alabat
Kalamian languages (2 languages of northern Palawan)
South Mindanao languages (5 languages)
Sangiric languages (4 languages of Sangir and Talaud Islands)
Minahasan languages (5 languages of North Sulawesi)
Unclassified
Umiray Dumaget

Formerly classified as one of the South Mindanao languages, the Klata language is now considered to be a primary branch of the Philippine languages by Zorc (2019).

Vocabulary
Comparison chart between several selected Philippine languages spoken from north to south with Proto-Austronesian first for comparison.

See also
Languages of the Philippines
List of regional languages of the Philippines
Philippine Negrito languages
Philippine literature
Komisyon sa Wikang Filipino
Visayan Academy of Arts and Letters
Defunct language regulators
Academia Bicolana
Sanghiran san Binisaya

Notes
1. Ambiguous relationship with other Northern Philippine groups
2. Ambiguous relationship with other Northern Philippine groups and has possible relationship with South Extension; equivalent to the widely established Batanic or Bashiic branch.

References

Works cited

Further reading

External links
Comparative vocabularies of Philippine and other Austronesian languages
Cognate sets for Austronesian languages
R. David Zorc field notes
Philippine etyma file cards by R. David Zorc
''Austronesian Basic Vocabulary Database 

 

Languages of Indonesia
Languages of Malaysia